Henning Fode (born 28 January 1948) is a Danish civil servant who is the Private Secretary to Margrethe II of Denmark.

Prior to his appointment, Henning Fode served in a number of positions in the Danish government. His last posting was as Director of Public Prosecutions and earlier he was Director General of the Danish Security Intelligence Service.

References

1948 births
Living people
Danish civil servants